Brian Christian (born 1984 in Wilmington, Delaware) is an American non-fiction author, poet, programmer and researcher, best known for a bestselling series of books about the human implications of computer science, including The Most Human Human (2011), Algorithms to Live By (2016), and The Alignment Problem (2020).

Christian competed as a "confederate" in the 2009 Loebner Prize competition, attempting to seem "more human" than the humans taking the test, and succeeded. The book he wrote about the experience, The Most Human Human, became a Wall Street Journal best-seller, a New York Times editors' choice, and a New Yorker favorite book of the year. He was interviewed by Jon Stewart on The Daily Show on March 8, 2011.

In 2010, Christian collaborated with film director Michael Langan on a short film adaptation of Christian's poem "Heliotropes," which was published in the final issue of Wholphin magazine.

In 2016, Christian collaborated with cognitive scientist Tom Griffiths on the book Algorithms to Live By, which became the #1 bestselling nonfiction book on Audible and was named an Amazon best science book of the year and an MIT Technology Review best book of the year.

His awards and honors include publication in The Best American Science and Nature Writing and fellowships at the Bread Loaf Writers' Conference, Yaddo, and MacDowell. Beginning in 2012, Christian has been a visiting scholar at the University of California, Berkeley. In 2016 Christian was named a Laureate of the San Francisco Public Library.

In 2020, Christian published his third book of nonfiction, The Alignment Problem, which looks at the rise of the ethics and safety movement in machine learning through historical research and the stories of approximately 100 researchers. The Alignment Problem was named a finalist for the Los Angeles Times Book Prize for best science and technology book of the year. For his work on The Alignment Problem, Christian received the National Academies Eric and Wendy Schmidt Award for Excellence in Science Communication, given by The National Academies of Sciences, Engineering, and Medicine in partnership with Schmidt Futures.

Early life and education
Christian is a native of Little Silver, New Jersey. He attended high school at High Technology High School in Lincroft, NJ.

Christian holds a degree from Brown University in computer science and philosophy, and an MFA in poetry from the University of Washington.

Influence
In 2014, Vanity Fair magazine reported that The Most Human Human was the "night-table reading" of Elon Musk.

Reading The Most Human Human inspired the playwright Jordan Harrison to write the play Marjorie Prime. The play was a finalist for the Pulitzer Prize and was released as a feature film in 2017.

The Most Human Human also inspired filmmaker Tommy Pallotta's 2018 documentary More Human Than Human, in which Christian appears.

In 2018, Algorithms to Live By was featured as an answer on the game show Jeopardy!.

In 2021, Microsoft CEO Satya Nadella wrote in Fast Company that The Alignment Problem was one of the "5 books that inspired" him that year.

Books
 The Most Human Human, 2011, Doubleday, 
 Algorithms to Live By, 2016, Henry Holt, 
 The Alignment Problem, 2020, Norton,

References

External links

1984 births
Brown University alumni
People from Little Silver, New Jersey
Writers from Wilmington, Delaware
Living people
University of Washington alumni
Poets from New Jersey
Poets from Delaware
American male poets
MacDowell Colony fellows
21st-century American poets
21st-century American male writers